The Fisher-Whiting House is an historic home in Dedham, Massachusetts originally built around 1669 by Anthony Fisher, Jr. Located at 218 Cedar Street, it is the second oldest house in Dedham after the Fairbanks House.

Originally the house was a single story and had an L-shaped floor plan. In 1761, Jonathan and Mary Fisher made the house square and added a second story. Today, the house is an example of colonial era architecture.

Anthony Fisher built the house on a 60-acre lot in the 1660s, though the exact date is not certain. Anthony left it to his son, Josiah Fisher, after his death in 1670. Josiah bequeathed the home and 60 acres to his grandson, Jonathon, in 1736.

Jonathan sold the house in 1765 to Dr. John Sprague who did not live there but used it as a rental property. Sprague sold the house in 1791 to Joseph Whiting, who deeded it to Edward Whiting in 1804. Edward deeded it to Edwin Whiting, his nephew, in 1844. The house and land were sold to a property developer in 1872. Sally Dresser Church purchased the home, which was in disrepair, in 1872 and planned to demolish it. She was persuaded to renovate the home instead.

When the Town of Dedham celebrated their 375th anniversary in 2011, the house was included in the celebrations. Students from Dedham High School drew an outline of the house for inclusion in a coloring book of historic places around town.

Gallery

Notes

References

Buildings and structures in Dedham, Massachusetts
1669 establishments in Massachusetts
History of Dedham, Massachusetts